Alfarabi José Romero Romero (born 29 September 1965) is a Venezuelan football manager and former player who played as a defender. He is the current manager of Marítimo de Venezuela.

Career
Born in La Guaira, Romero featured for local sides before retiring, notably representing Marítimo de Venezuela in two Copa Libertadores editions. After retiring, he worked at Caracas as a youth and assistant coach before being named at the helm of Pellícano in 2012.

Romero was subsequently in charge of Yaracuy and of Deportivo Petare's youth setup before returning to Caracas in 2014, where he worked as a youth and B-team manager. On 7 October 2016, he was named manager of Academia Puerto Cabello, but was dismissed the following 17 May.

In June 2017, Romero was appointed manager of Universidad Central, but left the club on 27 March of the following year. He subsequently worked as an assistant manager of Yaracuy and Zamora, being named interim manager of the latter on 31 August 2021.

Honours

Player
Marítimo de Venezuela
Venezuelan Primera División: 1992–93

References

External links

1965 births
Living people
People from La Guaira
Venezuelan footballers
Association football defenders
Venezuelan Primera División players
C.S. Marítimo de Venezuela players
Venezuelan football managers
Venezuelan Primera División managers
Academia Puerto Cabello managers
Zamora F.C. managers
20th-century Venezuelan people
21st-century Venezuelan people